The Independence Palace, also publicly known as the Reunification Convention Hall, is a landmark in Ho Chi Minh City (formerly known as Saigon), Vietnam. It was designed by architect Ngô Viết Thụ and was the home and workplace of the president of the Republic of (South) Vietnam. It was the site of the Fall of Saigon on 30 April 1975 that ended the Vietnam War, when a North Vietnamese Army tank crashed through its gates.

History

Republic of Vietnam

Construction of the current Independence Palace was ordered by President Ngô Đình Diệm in 1962 to replace the old palace, which was badly damaged due to being bombed by two dissident Republic of Vietnam Air Force pilots. It was constructed according to a design by Ngô Viết Thụ, a Vietnamese architect who won the First Grand Prize of Rome (Grand Prix de Rome) in 1955, the highest recognition of the Beaux-Arts school in Paris. He was also a laureate of the Prix de Rome awarded by the French government.

The construction of the palace started on 1 July 1962. Meanwhile, Diệm and his ruling family moved to Gia Long Palace (today the Ho Chi Minh City Museum). However, Diệm did not see the completed hall as he and his brother and chief adviser Ngô Đình Nhu were assassinated after a coup d'état led by General Dương Văn Minh in November 1963. The completed hall was inaugurated on 31 October 1966 by the chairman of the National Leadership Committee, General Nguyễn Văn Thiệu, who was then the head of a military junta. The Independence Hall served as Thiệu's home and office from October 1967 to 21 April 1975, when he fled the country as communist North Vietnamese forces swept southwards in the decisive Ho Chi Minh Campaign.

On 8 April 1975, Nguyễn Thanh Trung, a pilot of the South Vietnamese air force and an undetected communist spy flew an F-5E aircraft from Biên Hòa Air Base to bomb the palace but caused no significant damage. At 10:45 on 30 April 1975, a tank of the North Vietnamese army bulldozed through the main gate, effectively ending the Vietnam War.

Socialist Republic of Vietnam
In November 1975, after the negotiation convention between the communist North Vietnam and their colleagues in South Vietnam was completed, the Provisional Revolutionary Government renamed the palace Reunification Hall (Hội trường Thống Nhất).

The palace is depicted on the 200-đồng note of South Vietnam.

References

External links

Official website
Dinh Doc Lap - Independence Palace
Article about Reunification Palace The New York Times Magazine, 12 January 2003
Tourist attraction

Government buildings completed in 1966
Buildings and structures in Ho Chi Minh City
History of Ho Chi Minh City
Presidential residences
Office buildings in Vietnam
Tourist attractions in Ho Chi Minh City
Museums in Ho Chi Minh City
Palaces in Vietnam